Tomb of Tharo Khan is the tomb of Tharo Khan Talpur, located in Mirpur Khas, in Sindh, Pakistan. The tomb is related to the Tombs of Talpur Mirs complex, built in the eighteenth century in the city of Hyderabad. The tombs are of the ruling Talpur Mirs of Sindh.

Location
The tomb is located in Chitorri Graveyard outskirts of Mirpur Khas, in present-day southern Pakistan. The tomb of Mir Tharo Khan is located to the west of Mir Allah Yar Khan's mausoleum.

Present condition
The tombs are in a dilapidated condition. Erosion was made all over the complex due to the entry of water, damaging the tombs.

References

Mausoleums in Sindh
History of Sindh
Monuments and memorials in Sindh
Buildings and structures in Hyderabad, Sindh